Francis R. Nicosia (born October 29, 1944 in Philadelphia) works as a historian at the University of Vermont with a focus on modern history and Holocaust research.

Life
Francis R. Nicosia worked for the Peace Corps in Libya in 1968/69. In Germany he was employed in 1971/72 as a “Teacher Assistant” at the Peter Dörfler School in Marktoberdorf. He then studied history at Pennsylvania State University and Georgetown University and did his PhD in 1978 at McGill University in German History and Middle East History.

From 1979 to 2008 he was a professor of history at Saint Michael's College, Vermont, and has been a professor of Holocaust studies at the University of Vermont since then. Nicosia had a research stay in 1992 as a Fulbright scholarship holder at the Technical University of Berlin and in 2006 at the Humboldt University of Berlin.

In addition to his monographs, he is co-editor of various works and also contributes to encyclopedia of the Middle East and the Encyclopedia of the Holocaust, published by the United States Holocaust Memorial Museum.

Reviews
Avinoam Patt in his review of Zionism and Anti-Semitism in Nazi Germany wrote "In examining the inherently unequal relationship between these two nationalist movements [Germandom and Judaism], Nicosia has made an important contribution to both the history of Zionism and Nazism (and more broadly to the fields of German and Jewish history), while correcting misconceptions about the limits of actual Jewish and Zionist power."

Roderick Stackelberg writes "Zionism and Antisemitism in Nazi Germany is a scrupulous work of history, not politics, and Nicosia makes no references to the present, except to point out the irony that while anti-Zionism or criticism of the state of Israel in Europe or the United States today is often equated with antisemitism (or viewed as motivated by antisemitism), before 1933 antisemites were more likely to support Zionist aims than to oppose them."

David Motadel, reviewing Nazi Germany and the Arab World, writes "Nicosia's book can be read as a response to ... recent publications—as a re-examination of Nazi Germany's foreign policy toward Arab lands from Marrakesh to Muscat. Reviving (and extending) his 1980 thesis, he argues that the strategic interests and ideological outlooks of the two sides differed significantly. Yet the book is more than just a response to the recent works in the field; it provides a thorough chronological account of the Third Reich's involvement in the Arab world."

Works

References 

CV at Vermont

 1944 births
Living people
Historians from Pennsylvania
People from Philadelphia
20th-century American historians
20th-century American male writers
21st-century American historians
21st-century American male writers
University of Vermont faculty
Historians of the Holocaust
Peace Corps people
Pennsylvania State University alumni
Georgetown University alumni
McGill University alumni
Saint Michael's College faculty
American male non-fiction writers